Laurel Canyon Boulevard is a major street in the city of Los Angeles. It starts off at Polk Street in Sylmar in the northern San Fernando Valley near the junction of the San Diego (Interstate 405) and the Golden State (I-5)) freeways. Laurel Canyon Boulevard bypasses the city of San Fernando to the west, running parallel to I-5 in the vicinity of Pacoima and Arleta. The portion through Sun Valley passes through rock quarries and a great deal of open space.

From the intersection with Webb Avenue, Laurel Canyon Boulevard heads due south, cutting through North Hollywood, closely following the Hollywood Freeway (SR 170). Laurel Canyon Boulevard passes through the Valley Village neighborhood, one mile (1.6 km) west of the Hollywood Split (the intersection of the Hollywood (U.S. 101/SR 170) and Ventura (U.S. 101/SR 134) freeways). This would have been the start of the proposed Laurel Canyon Freeway, which would have provided a direct freeway connection from the southeastern San Fernando Valley to the Los Angeles International Airport. The proposed route was along the current routing of Laurel Canyon Boulevard, but the emergence of the Laurel Canyon neighborhood as a movie star enclave doomed the project, as did local opposition.

Laurel Canyon itself found counterculture fame in the 1960s as home to many of L.A.'s top rock musicians, such as Frank Zappa. The bohemian spirit endures; every year, residents gather for a group photograph at the country market. Laurel Canyon Boulevard was also immortalized by The Doors in their 1968 song "Love Street."

Laurel Canyon Boulevard crosses Laurel Canyon G Line station at its intersection with Chandler Boulevard in Valley Village. Laurel Canyon Boulevard is served by Metro Local lines 218 (south of Ventura Boulevard) and 230 (north of Ventura Boulevard).

South of Ventura Boulevard in Studio City, Laurel Canyon Boulevard ascends the Santa Monica Mountains, where it maintains a width of four lanes until the intersection of Mulholland Drive. The road climbs up Lookout Mountain before descending into West Hollywood, passing through Hollywood Boulevard. Laurel Canyon Boulevard’s southern terminus is at its intersection with Sunset Boulevard and Crescent Heights Boulevard.

Laurel Canyon Boulevard and Coldwater Canyon Avenue to the west between the southern San Fernando Valley and West Hollywood are also popular alternate routes to the Hollywood Freeway (US 101) during rush hour.

Laurel Canyon Freeway
The Laurel Canyon Freeway was to have been a north-south freeway in Central Los Angeles and its suburbs.  It derived its name from Laurel Canyon, the proposed route by which the freeway would traverse the Santa Monica Mountains.

Its proposed alignment was from the intersection of the Hollywood Freeway (U.S. Route 101) and the Ventura Freeway (California State Route 134) in the southeastern San Fernando Valley — to the San Diego Freeway (I-405) near Los Angeles International Airport.

However, the emerging popularity of Laurel Canyon as a movie star enclave in the 1960s ultimately doomed the project. The only portion of the freeway that was built was a small section of La Cienega Boulevard through the Baldwin Hills district of southwestern Los Angeles.

History
In 1919 Harry Houdini rented the cottage at 2435 Laurel Canyon Boulevard, while making movies for Lasky Pictures.  His wife occupied it for a time after his death. As of 2011 that site was a vacant lot.  The main mansion building itself was rebuilt after it was destroyed in the 1959 Laurel Canyon fire, and is now a historic venue.  While Houdini did not likely live at the "mansion," there is some probability that his widow did.

References

Notes

Citations

Streets in Los Angeles
Streets in Los Angeles County, California
Streets in the San Fernando Valley
Boulevards in the United States
Hollywood Hills
Laurel Canyon, Los Angeles
North Hollywood, Los Angeles
Pacoima, Los Angeles
San Fernando, California
Studio City, Los Angeles
Sun Valley, Los Angeles
Streets in West Hollywood, California
San Fernando Valley
Santa Monica Mountains